The Chapel of the Good Shepherd, Carlett Park is in Eastham, Merseyside, England.  It is recorded in the National Heritage List for England as a designated Grade II listed building.

History

The chapel was built in the grounds of the mansion in Carlett Park in 1884–85 to a design by the Chester architect John Douglas.  The chapel was commissioned by the owner of the mansion, Revd W. E. Torr, who was a canon of Chester Cathedral and the vicar of Eastham.

Architecture

The chapel is built in red sandstone.  It has bands of lighter stone and a slate roof.  Its plan consists of a continuous nave and chancel with a north transept.  At the northwest is an octagonal bell-turret with a spire.  Over the entrance is a canopied niche containing a figure of the Good Shepherd.  The windows are lancets and the interior has ashlar stone.  The windows contain stained glass by Kempe and by E. Frampton.  Internally, framing the east window, are mosaic panels.

See also

Listed buildings in Eastham, Merseyside
List of new churches by John Douglas

References

Gothic Revival church buildings in England
Gothic Revival architecture in Merseyside
Former Church of England church buildings
Grade II listed churches in Merseyside
Churches completed in 1885
19th-century Church of England church buildings
Church of England church buildings in Merseyside
John Douglas buildings